opened in Ebetsu, Hokkaidō, Japan in 1999. Its aim is to protect, preserve, and utilize buried cultural properties.

History
In December 2017, researchers from the Hokkaido Archaeological Operations Center announced the discovery of the oldest ancient stone with a human face painted on it (12x13cm), estimating its creation date between 2,500 and 1,000 B.C.

Description
The exhibition hall features two Important Cultural Properties: an earthen Jōmon mask from the Mamachi Site and artefacts excavated from the Bibi 8 Site.

Collection
350x80x33cm chiseled monolith
Magemono made of Thujopsis, excavated in Yukanboshi

See also
 List of Cultural Properties of Japan - archaeological materials (Hokkaidō)
 List of Cultural Properties of Japan - historical materials (Hokkaidō)
 List of Historic Sites of Japan (Hokkaidō)
 Hokkaido Museum
 Ainu culture

References

External links
  Official website
  Hokkaido Archaeological Operations Center

Museums in Hokkaido
Archaeological museums in Japan
History of Hokkaido
Ebetsu, Hokkaido
Museums established in 1999
1999 establishments in Japan